Husinec is a municipality and village in Prague-East District in the Central Bohemian Region of the Czech Republic. It has about 1,500 inhabitants. It lies on the Vltava River.

Administrative parts
The village of Řež is an administrative part of Husinec.

Geography
It lies in the Prague Plateau. It it situated in a meander of the Vltava River, partly in the valley of the river and partly on a promontory above the valley.

The municipality is known for high average temperatures, which are caused by the specific relief of the landscape and the natural conditions of the river valley. Drought-tolerant and heat-tolerant plants typical of subtropical climates thrive here. On 19 June 2022, the highest June temperature in the Czech Republic was recorded here, namely .

History
The first written mention of Husinec is in a deed of King Ottokar I of Bohemia from 1227, Řež was first mentioned in a deed of Duke Vratislaus I from 1088.

The municipality was hit by the 2002 European floods.

Transport
The municipality is served by the Řež train stration on the railway line from Prague to Kralupy nad Vltavou, however, this station is located on the other bank of the Vltava, outside the municipal territory.

Science
The Nuclear Physics Institute of the CAS was established in Řež in 1955. Since 2007 it is a public research institution.

References

External links

 (in Czech)

Villages in Prague-East District